Amber is the second studio album by English electronic music duo Autechre, released on 7 November 1994 by Warp. It was the first Autechre album to be composed entirely of new material, as their debut album Incunabula (1993) was a compilation of older tracks.

Production and style 
Unlike Incunabula, which was part of Warp's Artificial Intelligence series of albums and predominantly a compilation of older material, Amber was described by Autechre member Rob Brown as "genuinely the first album we put out on Warp". Designed by Ian Anderson of The Designers Republic, the cover art is a detail of a panoramic photograph of sandstone cliffs in Cappadocia, Turkey, taken by landscape photographer Nick Meers.

Select described the album as a "'90s update of electro's cut-'n'-paste rhythmics into the realms of the odd," and stated that Amber "made music by μ-Ziq or Aphex Twin seem almost conventional." CMJ described the sound of Amber as "entirely electronic and entirely instrumental" outside a few vocal samples. 
In a 2013 retrospective feature, Fact described Amber as containing "some of Autechre's most ambient moments," and compared several songs ("Nine" and "Yulquen") to the works of Brian Eno, saying that their "beatless, but powerful low-end means that they’re contemplative rather than ethereal". Fact also described songs such as "Montreal" and "Piezo" as uniquely-styled pieces with "deep veins of techno and acid house".

Release
Amber was first released by Warp on 7 November 1994 on compact disc, double vinyl and cassette. The album was released in the United States on 24 January 1995 by Wax Trax! and TVT Records.

The album has subsequently been reissued in all major formats, including digital download. Warp notably reissued Autechre's first three albums—Incunabula, Amber and Tri Repetae—on vinyl on 11 November 2016.

Critical reception

Selects Gareth Grundy rated the album four out of five, describing Autechre as "out on the fringes, having a good rummage for the weird and beautiful," and stating that the album was not "goalless experimentation. There's plenty of melody on board, it's just that it creeps up on you from behind." CMJ writer Heidi MacDonald noted that Autechre's more rhythmic music, such as "Glitch" and "Piezo," is "almost hypnotically listenable" but that slower tracks were "dangerously close to new age". Ned Raggett of AllMusic gave the album a four-and-a-half star rating out of five, and compared the album to Incunabula, opining that "a couple of tracks could be removed with no problem, while tracks like "Montreal" and "Slip" continue the basic Incunabula formula without noticeable change." Raggett concluded that "things are clearly starting to gel a little more here than on previous releases; the great leap forward becomes all the more logical in retrospect."

In 2008, Rob Brown described listening to Incunabula and Amber again, and commented on "how cheesy they were, and how contrasted our newer ideas are." Brown clarified his statement in 2013, explaining that the comment "was easily misinterpreted" and that he simply intended to say that the earlier albums "were perhaps more simple [than their more recent work], but not in a shit way."

In The New Rolling Stone Album Guide, critic Ben Sisario gave both Incunabula and Amber two and half stars out of five, describing them as "smart if unexciting ambient watercolors" that "give no indication of the innovations to follow". Writing about Amber upon the occasion of the 2016 vinyl reissue, Pitchforks Andy Beta stated that the melodies of "Slip" had not aged well, and that parts of "Glitch" and "Piezo" were "dulled and gentle in hindsight, knowing just what nasty and brutish sounds [Autechre] would soon wring out of their gear." He concluded that "What makes Amber fascinating to revisit decades on is to hear vestigial organs and sonic cul-de-sacs that Autechre would bin almost immediately after. ... prov[ing] that at one point the duo was human after all." In 2017, Pitchfork ranked Amber at number 16 on its list of "The 50 Best IDM Albums of All Time".

Track listing

Personnel 
Credits adapted from the liner notes of Amber.

 Autechre – production
 The Designers Republic – design

Charts

See also 
 1994 in music
 Music of the United Kingdom (1990s)

References 

1994 albums
Autechre albums
Warp (record label) albums
Albums with cover art by The Designers Republic